Czerna may refer to:

Czerna, Bolesławiec County in Lower Silesian Voivodeship (south-west Poland)
Czerna, Głogów County in Lower Silesian Voivodeship (south-west Poland)
Czerna, Środa Śląska County in Lower Silesian Voivodeship (south-west Poland)
Czerna, Lesser Poland Voivodeship (south Poland)
Czerna, Żagań County in Lubusz Voivodeship (west Poland)
Czerna, Żary County in Lubusz Voivodeship (west Poland)

See also
Černá (disambiguation)
Czerny (surname)